Richard Cornish, also known as Richard Williams, was an English ship captain. He is known for being accused of raping an indentured servant, William Couse, and is reported to have been one of the earliest people, if not the first person, to have been hanged for sodomy in what would eventually become the United States.

Rape accusations
In 1624 Cornish was ship master of the Ambrose, which was harbored in the James River of August of that year. During this time Couse worked on the Ambrose and was ordered to put clean sheets on Cornish's bed, upon which point Couse alleged that his master had been drunk and made a sexual advance upon him. Despite Couse's refusal, Cornish was then reported to have forcibly sodomized Couse. He also reported that Cornish also later sexually fondled him on numerous occasions and also humiliated him in front of the rest of the crew.

Trial
Couse left the ship and deposed to the governor and other members of the council of the colony of Virginia that Cornish had forcibly sodomized him. There was no trial in the modern sense. For example, Cornish is not on record as defending himself or even having the chance to defend himself. It is impossible to know whether what Couse alleged is true.  Few facts have survived the passage of four centuries.  Much of what is said today on the topic is speculative or political in nature.  There is evidence of a member of the crew - the only member of the crew aboard the ship when the alleged incident occurred, according to Couse - deposing overhearing a conversation between Couse and Cornish.  But this witness does not depose Cornish had sodomized Couse, only that Couse later claimed Cornish had wanted to sodomize him.  Cornish was not found guilty by the governor and council, judging by evidence.  It can be assumed Cornish was executed by hanging, taking at face value extant depositions made after the fact.  It is not at all clear, however, that anyone from the colonial government knew about the intent to execute Cornish before it happened, much less that the colonial government had found the man guilty, sentenced him, and executed on the sentence.  It is all too possible Cornish was killed by the crewmen of his ship.  Maybe they hated him or something he had done and sought revenge.

There is evidence the justice of execution was just questioned 400 years ago.  The person who questioned it most, it seems, was the brother of Cornish.  Others considered the execution wrongful, but it is unclear Virginia's governor had anything to do with it.  A more likely culprit in the colonial government, if there is one, is Captain William Tucker, but there is no evidence of responsibility on his part.  Sir Francis Wyatt, the governor, may well have had an interest in downplaying the killing even if the government had nothing to do with it.  It does make sense to question a possible cover up on the part of government, but this is totally different from claiming the governor executed Cornish.  Some people were punished for saying the execution of Cornish was wrongful.  This can be interpreted as suggesting the colonial government was involved in the execution, but a suggestion is not a fact.  Readers should avoid relying on speculative interpretations of the incident and prefer to read the original documents for themselves, or at least a decent transcription of the documents [e.g. McIlwaine, H.R. (1924) Minutes of the Council and General Court of Colonial Virginia 1622-1632, 1670-1676 (Richmond, Virginia: Library Board, Virginia State Library)].  Edward Nevell did indeed have both his ears cut off, and he was barred from being a free man in Virginia, judging by the extant record, but this punishment had little or nothing to do with his comments on Cornish, judging by the record, which by the way do not question the execution but instead appear to support it.  Instead, Nevell was punished for damaging the ship under his command, the Swan, failing to live up to contractual obligations, annoying clientele of the Virginia Company, allowing cargo to become damaged, etc.

Legacy
In 1993 the William and Mary Gay and Lesbian Alumni created the Richard Cornish Endowment Fund for Gay and Lesbian Resources.

References

Year of birth missing
1625 deaths
People executed by the Thirteen Colonies by hanging
Sea captains
People executed for rape
17th century in LGBT history
17th-century LGBT people
American people convicted of sodomy
People executed for sodomy
LGBT people from Virginia
Violence against men in North America